Dawne L. Deskins is a retired United States Air Force major general who last served as the deputy director of the Air National Guard from July 2020 to February 2021. Previously, she was the director of manpower and personnel of the National Guard Bureau from December 2018 to July 2020. Deskins earned a B.S. degree in communications from Ithaca College in 1984. She later received an M.S. degree in management from Florida State University in 1992.

Her retirement ceremony occurred on February 25, 2022.

References

External links
 

Year of birth missing (living people)
Living people
Place of birth missing (living people)
Ithaca College alumni
Florida State University alumni
Recipients of the Meritorious Service Medal (United States)
Recipients of the Legion of Merit
United States Air Force generals
Recipients of the Defense Superior Service Medal